Sri Lanka is a tropical island situated close to the southern tip of India. The invertebrate fauna is as large as it is common to other regions of the world. There are about 2 million species of arthropods found in the world, and still it is counting. So many new species are discover up to this time also. So it is very complicated and difficult to summarize the exact number of species found within a certain region.

The following list provide the pseudoscorpions in Sri Lanka.

Scorpions
Phylum: Arthropoda   Class: Arachnida
Order: Pseudoscorpiones

Pseudoscorpions also known as false scorpion or book scorpion, are easily identified by flat, pear-shaped body and scorpion-like pincers. There are about 3,300 species of scorpions described within 6 superfamilies and 430 genera. The studies on pseudoscorpions of Sri Lanka dated back to 1913 with the contributions of Ellingsen, who described Olpium jacobsoni. In 1930, Chamberlain described two pseudoscorpions, whereas Max Beier described Paratemnus ceylonicus in 1932. However, the first extensive study on pseudoscorpions were carried out by C. Besuchet and I. Löbl in 1970. In 1973, Beier described 16 new species, with one new genus. Beier is thus cited as the first person to make a checklist on Sri Lankan pseudoscorpions.

With thirty years of war in northern region, the diversity of fauna in northern and eastern regions reduced in greater extent. In 2011, Mark S. Harvey et al described new synonyms and genera for pseudoscorpions. The following list of pseudoscorpions of Sri Lanka compiled according to the 2014 survey by Sudesh Batuwita and Suresh P. Benjamin. According to them, Sri Lanka consists 47 species with 20 endemic species, which included to 15 genera.

Family: Chthoniidae 
 Lagynochthonius brincki
 Tyrannochthonius heterodentatus

Family: Pseudotyrannochthoniidae 
 Afrochthonius ceylonicus - Endemic
 Afrochthonius reductus - Endemic

Family: Feaellidae 
 Feaella (Tetrafeaella) indica

Family: Hyidae 
 Hya chamberlini - Endemic

Family: Ideoroncidae 
 Nhatrangia ceylonensis - Endemic

Family: Syarinidae 
 Ideoblothrus ceylonicus - Endemic

Family: Garypidae 
 Garypus maldivensis

Family: Geogarypidae 
 Geogarypus tenuis - Endemic
 Indogarypus ceylonicus 
 Indogarypus indicus

Family: Olpiidae 
 Calocheiridius mussardi - Endemic
 Indolpium loyolae
 Minniza ceylonica - Endemic
 Olpium ceylonicum - Endemic
 Olpium jacobsoni

Family: Sternophoridae 
 Afrosternophorus ceylonicus

Family: Cheiridiidae 
 Cryptocheiridium sp.

Family: Atemnidae 
 Anatemnus javanus
 Anatemnus nilgiricus
 Anatemnus orites
 Micratemnus anderssoni - Endemic
 Micratemnus ceylonicus
 Micratemnus sp
 Oratemnus indicus
 Oratemnus loyolai
 Oratemnus navigator
 Oratemnus proximus
 Paratemnoides pallidus
 Stenatemnus brincki

Family: Cheliferidae 
 Lissochelifer depressoides
 Lophochernes cederholmi
 Lophochernes ceylonicus - Endemic
 Mucrochelifer borneoensis
 Telechelifer lophonotus - Endemic

Family: Chernetidae 
 Ceriochernes besucheti - Endemic
 Haplochernes warburgi
 Parachernes (Parachernes) cocophilus
 Parachernes (Parachernes) indicus
 Parapilanus ceylonicus - Endemic
 Verrucachernes oca
 Verrucachernes aff. oca
 Lamprochernes nodosus
 Megachernes kanneliyensis - Endemic

Family: Withiidae 
 Withius ceylanicus - Endemic
 Withius piger

References

 
Sri Lanka
Scorpions